The 2009 Hel van het Mergelland was the 36th edition of the Volta Limburg Classic cycle race and was held on 4 April 2009. The race started and finished in Eijsden. The race was won by Mauro Finetto.

General classification

References

2009
2009 in road cycling
2009 in Dutch sport